Taiomidae is an extinct taxonomic family of fossil predatory sea snails, marine gastropod mollusks in the clade Neogastropoda.

References

Prehistoric gastropods